George J. Weigle (4 December 1871 in Milwaukee, Wisconsin – 28 April 1956) was a member of the Wisconsin State Senate.

Career
Weigle was a member of the Senate from 1911 to 1914. He was a Republican.

References

1871 births
1956 deaths
Politicians from Milwaukee
Republican Party Wisconsin state senators